The cant of a railway track or camber of a road (also referred to as superelevation, cross slope or cross fall) is the rate of change in elevation (height) between the two rails or edges. This is normally greater where the railway or road is curved; raising the outer rail or the outer edge of the road creates a banked turn, thus allowing vehicles to maneuver through the curve at higher speeds than would otherwise be possible were the surface flat or level.

Rail 

On railways, cant helps a train steer around a curve, keeping the wheel flanges from touching the rails, minimizing friction, wear and rail squeal.

The main functions of cant are the following:
 Improve distribution of the load across both rails
 Reduce wear on rails and wheels
 Neutralize the effect of lateral forces
 Improve passenger comfort

The necessary cant in a curve depends on the expected speed of the trains and the radius. However, it may be necessary to select a compromise value at design time, for example if slow-moving trains may occasionally use tracks intended for high-speed trains.

Generally the aim is for trains to run without flange contact, which also depends on the tire profile of the wheels. Allowance has to be made for the different speeds of trains. Slower trains will tend to make flange contact with the inner rail on curves, while faster trains will tend to ride outwards and make contact with the outer rail. Either contact causes wear and tear and may lead to derailment. Many high-speed lines do not permit slower freight trains, particularly with heavier axle loads. In some cases, the impact is reduced by the use of flange lubrication.

Ideally, the track should have sleepers (railroad ties) at a closer spacing and a greater depth of ballast to accommodate the increased forces exerted in the curve.

At the ends of a curve, the amount of cant cannot change from zero to its maximum immediately. It must change (ramp) gradually in a track transition curve. The length of the transition depends on the maximum allowable speed; the higher the speed, the greater length is required.

where  is the superelevation in inches,  is the curvature of the track in degrees per 100 feet, and  the maximum speed in MPH.

For high-speed railways in Europe, maximum cant is  when slow freight trains are not allowed.

The highest values are only for tilting trains, because it would be too uncomfortable for passengers in conventional train cars.

Physics of track cant 
Ideally, the amount of cant , given the speed  of a train, the radius of curvature  and the gauge  of the track, the relation

must be fulfilled, with  the gravitational acceleration. This follows simply from a balance between weight, centrifugal force, and normal force. In the approximation it is assumed that the cant is small compared to the gauge of the track. It is often convenient to define the unbalanced cant  as the maximum allowed additional amount of cant that would be required by a train moving faster than the speed for which the cant was designed, setting the maximum allowed speed . In a formula this becomes

with  the curvature of the track, which is also the turn in radians per unit length of track.

In the United States, maximum speed is subject to specific rules.

Examples 
In Australia, the Australian Rail Track Corporation is increasing speed around curves sharper than an  radius by replacing wooden sleepers with concrete ones so that the cant can be increased.

Rail cant 
The rails themselves are now usually canted inwards by about 5 to 10 percent.

In 1925 about 15 of 36 major American railways had adopted this practice.

Roads 

In civil engineering, cant is often referred to as cross slope or camber. It helps rainwater drain from the road surface. Along straight or gently curved sections, the middle of the road is normally higher than the edges. This is called "normal crown" and helps shed rainwater off the sides of the road. During road works that involve lengths of temporary carriageway, the slope may be the opposite to normal – for example, with the outer edge higher – which causes vehicles to lean towards oncoming traffic. In the UK, this is indicated on warning signs as "adverse camber".

On more severe bends, the outside edge of the curve is raised, or superelevated, to help vehicles around the curve. The amount of superelevation increases with its design speed and with curve sharpness.

Off-camber

An off-camber corner is described as the opposite of a  banked turn, or a negative-bank turn, which is lower on the outside of a turn than on the inside. Off-camber corners are both feared and celebrated by skilled drivers. Handling them is a major factor in skilled vehicle control, both single-track and automotive; both engine-powered and human-powered vehicles; both on and off closed courses; and both on and off paved surfaces.

On race courses, they are one of a handful of engineering factors at the disposal of a course designer in order to challenge and test drivers' skills. Off-camber corners were described by a training guide for prospective racers as "the hardest corners you will encounter" on the track. Many notable courses such as Riverside International Raceway combine off-camber corners with elevation and link corners for extra driver challenge.

On the street, they are a feature of some of the world's most celebrated paved roads, such as The "Dragon" (US 129) through Deals Gap and the "Diamondback" (NC 226A) in North Carolina, Route 78 in Ohio, Route 125 in Pennsylvania, Route 33 in California, and Betws-y-Coed Triangle at Snowdonia National Park in Wales.

To mountain bikers and motorcyclists on trails and dirt tracks, off-camber corners are also challenging, and can be either an engineered course feature, or a natural feature of single-track trails. In cyclocross, off-camber sections are very common as the courses snake around ridges, adding difficulty.

Camber in virtual race circuits is carefully controlled by video game race simulators to achieve the designer's desired level of difficulty.

See also 
 Banked turn
 Camber angle
 Profilograph
 Tilting train

References

Further reading
 — includes camber in evaluating engineering of roads, one of six numerical factors modeled to determine desirability for motorcycle touring

Track geometry
Road infrastructure